Thiotricha wollastoni is a moth of the family Gelechiidae. It was described by Walsingham in 1894. It is found on Madeira.

The wingspan is 14–15 mm. The forewings are brown, with a narrow creamy-white streak along the dorsal margin extending to the apex and including the 
cilia, but interrupted beyond the anal angle by two oblique brown streaks, the first along the apical margin, the second, shorter, in the cilia. Beneath the apex a slight darkish line in the base of the cilia around the apex is preceded by a faint indication of a pale, very oblique line, commencing at the anterior extremity of the costal cilia and terminating below the apex of the wing. The hindwings are shining, pale grey.

References

Moths described in 1894
Thiotricha